Strassen may refer to:

Volker Strassen, mathematician
Strassen algorithm
Strassen, Luxembourg, town
Strassen, Tyrol, town in the district of Lienz in Tyrol, Austria